The Capriccio Italien, Op. 45, is a fantasy for orchestra composed between January and May 1880 by Pyotr Ilyich Tchaikovsky. It premiered 18 December, 1880 (New System) in Moscow, conducted by Nikolay Rubinstein. 

A typical performance of the piece lasts about 15 minutes.

Background
The Capriccio was inspired by a trip Tchaikovsky took to Rome with his brother Modest as respite from the composer's disastrous marriage with Antonina Miliukova. It was in Rome, however, that the observant Tchaikovsky called Raphael a "Mozart of painting."

While in Rome, he wrote to his friend Nadezhda von Meck:
I have already completed the sketches for an Italian fantasia on folk tunes for which I believe a good fortune may be predicted. It will be effective, thanks to the delightful tunes which I have succeeded in assembling partly from anthologies, partly from my own ears in the streets.
Conductor JoAnn Falletta says:
We are hearing foreigners' views of Italy. . . . [however,] Capriccio Italien has great power, even though it's practically a pops piece, Tchaikovsky knows what the instruments can do in a virtuoso way. He brings them to their limit in the most thrilling fashion. He has a gift for mixing families of instruments just right – like cantabile strings along with mighty brass. I hear the ballet element in everything Tchaikovsky writes, in his sense of rhythm. You can practically dance to both these scores!

The piece, initially called Italian Fantasia after Mikhail Glinka's Spanish pieces, was originally dedicated to the virtuosic cellist Karl Davydov and premiered in Moscow on 18 December 1880, with Nikolai Rubinstein conducting the Imperial Russian Musical Society.

Structure
The Capriccio is scored for: 3 flutes (3rd doubling on piccolo), 2 oboes, English horn, 2 clarinets in A, 2 bassoons, 4 horns in F, 2 cornets in A, 2 trumpets in E, 3 trombones (2 tenor, 1 bass), tuba, 3 timpani, triangle, tambourine, cymbals, bass drum, glockenspiel, harp and strings.

After a brief bugle call, inspired by a bugle call Tchaikovsky heard daily in his rooms at the Hotel Costanzi, next door to the barracks of the Royal Italian Cuirasseurs, a stoic, heroic, unsmiling melody is played by the strings. Eventually, this gives way to music sounding as if it could be played by an Italian street band, beginning in the winds and ending with the whole orchestra. Next, a lively march ensues, followed by a lively tarantella. One of the main themes is another Italian folk song, precisely from Tuscany, Bella ragazza dalle trecce bionde.

The brothers were there during Carnival, and, despite calling it "a folly," the composer was able to soak up Italian street music and folk songs which he then incorporated into his Capriccio. This enables some "bright primary colors and uncomplicated tunefulness."

References

Sources
Brown, David. Tchaikovsky: The Years of Wandering, 1878–85. London: Gollancz, 1986

External links

 Italian Capriccio, Tchaikovsky Research
; Moscow City Symphony – Russian Philharmonic conducted by Michail Jurowski

1880 compositions
Compositions by Pyotr Ilyich Tchaikovsky
Compositions for symphony orchestra
Compositions in A major
Tchaikovsky
Music with dedications
Compositions using folk songs